William Meyer (June 22, 1863 – September 6, 1926) was a United States Navy sailor and a recipient of America's highest military decoration—the Medal of Honor—for his actions in the Battle of Cienfuegos during the Spanish–American War.

William Meyer died at the age of 63 and was buried in Forest Home Cemetery, Forest Park, Illinois.

Medal of Honor citation
Carpenter's Mate Third Class Meyer's official Medal of Honor citation reads:
On board the U.S.S. Nashville during the operation of cutting the cable leading from Cienfuegos, Cuba, 11 May 1898. Facing the heavy fire of the enemy, Meyer displayed extraordinary bravery and coolness throughout this action.

See also

 List of Medal of Honor recipients for the Spanish–American War

Notes

References

 

1863 births
1926 deaths
German emigrants to the United States
United States Navy Medal of Honor recipients
People from Cook County, Illinois
American military personnel of the Spanish–American War
United States Navy sailors
Burials at Forest Home Cemetery, Chicago
German-born Medal of Honor recipients
Spanish–American War recipients of the Medal of Honor